Vlad Țepeș is a commune in Călărași County, Muntenia, Romania. As of 2011 Vlad Țepeș has a population of 2,336.

The commune and one of its two villages are named after Vlad Țepeș; the other village, Mihai Viteazu, is named after Michael the Brave.

Natives
 Octav Sargețiu (1908–1994), poet

References

Communes in Călărași County
Localities in Muntenia
Vlad the Impaler